Thaumantis is a Southeast Asian genus of butterflies in the family Nymphalidae. Its consists of large, showy butterflies with iridescent purplish blue bands on the dorsal wing surfaces.

Species
 Thaumantis diores Doubleday, 1845 – jungle glory
 Thaumantis klugius (Zinken, 1831) – dark blue jungle glory
 Thaumantis noureddin Westwood, 1851
 Thaumantis odana (Godart, [1824])

References

External links
Images representing Thaumantis at EOL  
Images representing Thaumantis at BOLD

 
Nymphalidae genera
Taxa named by Jacob Hübner
Amathusiini